Cobyrinate a,c-diamide synthase, cobyrinic acid a,c-diamide synthetase, CbiA (gene)) is an enzyme which catalyses the chemical reaction

 2 ATP + cobyrinate + 2 L-glutamine + 2 H2O  2 ADP + 2 phosphate + cobyrinate a,c-diamide + 2 L-glutamate (overall reaction)
(1a) ATP + cobyrinate + L-glutamine + H2O  ADP + phosphate + cobyrinate c-monamide + L-glutamate
(1b) ATP + cobyrinate c-monamide + L-glutamine + H2O  ADP + phosphate + cobyrinate a,c-diamide + L-glutamate

This enzyme is a glutamine amidotransferase, part of the biosynthetic pathway to cobalamin (vitamin B12) in anaerobic bacteria such as Salmonella typhimurium and Bacillus megaterium.

See also
 Cobalamin biosynthesis

References

External links 
 

EC 6.3.5